Wayward Son is a 1999 American film.

Wayward Son(s) may also refer to:

 Wayward Son (novel), a 2019 young-adult novel by Rainbow Rowell
 The Wayward Son, a 1914 silent film directed by Harry C. Mathews
 Wayward Sons (band), a British band featuring Toby Jepson
 "Wayward Sons" (Rubicon), a 2010 television episode
 Wayward Sons, a webcomic by Red Giant Entertainment

See also
 "Carry On Wayward Son", a 1976 song by Kansas
 The Wayward Sons of Mother Earth, a 1991 album by Skyclad